Stelis jurisdixii is a species of orchid plant native to Colombia.

References 

jurisdixii
Flora of Colombia